The Journal of High Energy Physics is a monthly peer-reviewed open access scientific journal covering the field of high energy physics. It is published by Springer Science+Business Media on behalf of the International School for Advanced Studies. The journal is part of the SCOAP3 initiative. According to the Journal Citation Reports, the journal has a 2020 impact factor of 5.810.

References

External links

Journal page at International School for Advanced Studies website

English-language journals
Monthly journals
Physics journals
Publications established in 1997
Springer Science+Business Media academic journals
Academic journals associated with learned and professional societies
Particle physics journals